Vasili Vasilyevich Kiryienka (Łacinka: Vasil Vasilevič Kiryjenka; born 28 June 1981) is a Belarusian former racing cyclist, who rode professionally between 2006 and 2020 for the OTC Doors,  and  squads. He currently works as a directeur sportif for UCI Continental team .

Career

Early years
Born in Rechytsa, Byelorussian Soviet Socialist Republic, Kiryienka won his first national time trial championship in 2002. His early career focused mainly on the track, where he won the Points Race at the 2008 UCI Track Cycling World Championships. Later that season Kiryienka won Stage 19 of the Giro d'Italia, a mountainous affair leading to Presolana, after spending the day on the attack and registering more than 6 hours and a half in the saddle. He attacked his six breakaway companions at the foot of the Monte Para climb and soloed to the finish for the win, by a margin of over four minutes.

Caisse d'Epargne (2009–2012)

Kiryienka moved to the Spanish  squad for the 2009 season.

In 2010 he finished second in the tenth stage of the Tour de France after he was outsprinted at the line in Gap by Sérgio Paulinho after the pair's decisive attack with  remaining.

On 23 May 2011, during the Giro d'Italia, Kiryienka's  teammate Xabier Tondo was killed in a freak accident at home while preparing to train with teammates. He was reportedly crushed between his car and a garage door. Five days later, Kiryienka rode to victory in a solo effort on Stage 20, a mountain top finish at Sestriere, and he dedicated the stage victory to Tondó, pointing skyward as he crossed the finish line. The team had met to consider withdrawing from the race after Tondó's death, but instead the riders unanimously voted to ride on. Kiryienka commented that the squad at the Giro hoped to get a further stage win (as Francisco Ventoso's win had come before Tondó's death) to honor him, while other members of the team grieved with Tondó's family.

In September 2012, Kiryienka finished third in the individual time trial at the road world championships.

Team Sky (2013–2020)

Kiryienka left  at the end of the 2012 season, and joined  on an initial three-year contract from the 2013 season onwards.

In June 2015, he won the individual time trial at the inaugural European Games in Baku, Azerbaijan. On 23 September 2015, Kiryienka won the individual time trial at the CI Road World Championships in Richmond, Virginia, United States.

Kiryienka had the honor to carry the flag of his native Belarus at the opening ceremony of the 2016 Summer Olympics in Rio de Janeiro, where he competed in the men's individual time trial event; he finished in 17th place. In October, he competed in the same event at the World Championships in Doha, where he won the silver medal – giving him at least one medal of each colour for his career.

In January 2020, Kiryienka retired from the sport due to recurring "cardiac issues".

Major results

1999
 3rd Time trial, National Road Championships
2000
 2nd Time trial, National Road Championships
2001
 2nd Time trial, National Road Championships
2002
 1st  Time trial, National Road Championships
2003
 UCI Track World Cup, Aguascalientes
1st  Individual pursuit
3rd  Team pursuit
 UEC European Under-23 Track Championships
3rd  Individual pursuit
3rd  Team pursuit
2004
 National Road Championships
2nd Time trial
3rd Road race
 3rd  Individual pursuit, UCI Track World Cup, Aguascalientes
 6th Overall Tour of Turkey
2005
 1st  Time trial, National Road Championships
 1st  Points race, 2004–05 UCI Track Cycling World Cup Classics, Manchester
 1st Coppa della Pace
 1st Giro del Casentino
 1st Coppa Comune Castelfranco di Sopra
 1st Coppa Mobilio Ponsacco – Cronometro
 1st Stage 3 Giro della Toscana Under-23
2006
 1st  Time trial, National Road Championships
 2006–07 UCI Track Cycling World Cup Classics
1st  Scratch, Sydney
2nd  Points race, Moscow
3rd  Points race, Sydney
 2nd Overall Scandinavian Week
1st Stage 3
 2nd Scandinavian Open
 3rd  Points race, UCI Track World Championships
 3rd Riga Grand Prix
 4th Tallinn–Tartu GP
 4th Szlakiem Walk Majora Hubala
 5th Overall Five Rings of Moscow
 6th Time trial, UCI Road World Championships
 8th Overall Course de la Solidarité Olympique
1st Stage 6
2007
 1st Stage 3 Ster Elektrotoer
 1st Stage 5 Vuelta a Burgos
 2nd Overall Étoile de Bessèges
 2nd Eindhoven Team Time Trial
 3rd Time trial, National Road Championships
 7th Overall Tirreno–Adriatico
 8th Overall Tour of Austria
 8th Tour du Haut Var
 9th Time trial, UCI Road World Championships
 9th Grand Prix de Fourmies
2008
 1st  Points race, UCI Track World Championships
 1st Stage 19 Giro d'Italia
 1st Stage 1 (TTT) Settimana Ciclistica Lombarda
 2nd Time trial, National Road Championships
 2nd Overall Ster Elektrotoer
 2nd Gran Premio Città di Camaiore
 7th Overall Vuelta a Murcia
2011
 1st  Overall Route du Sud
 1st Stage 20 Giro d'Italia
 2nd Overall Critérium International
1st  Points classification
 9th Overall Vuelta a Murcia
 10th Overall Tour of the Basque Country
1st Stage 2
2012
 3rd  Time trial, UCI Road World Championships
 6th Overall Critérium du Dauphiné
2013
 1st Stage 18 Vuelta a España
 UCI World Road Championships
3rd  Team time trial
4th Time trial
2014
 1st Stage 1b (TTT) Settimana Internazionale di Coppi e Bartali
 3rd Overall Bayern Rundfahrt
 4th Time trial, UCI Road World Championships
  Combativity award Stage 11 Vuelta a España
2015
 1st  Time trial, UCI Road World Championships
 1st  Time trial, European Games
 1st  Time trial, National Road Championships
 1st Chrono des Nations
 1st Stage 14 (ITT) Giro d'Italia
2016
 1st Chrono des Nations
 2nd  Time trial, UCI Road World Championships
2017
 UCI Road World Championships
3rd  Team time trial
5th Time trial
 6th GP Miguel Induráin
2018
 1st  Time trial, National Road Championships
 9th Time trial, UCI Road World Championships
2019
 1st  Time trial, European Games

Grand Tour general classification results timeline

References

External links

 Vasil Kiryienka profile at Team Sky
 
 Palmares at Cycling Base (French)

Belarusian male cyclists
1981 births
Living people
Belarusian Giro d'Italia stage winners
Belarusian Vuelta a España stage winners
Cyclists at the 2004 Summer Olympics
Cyclists at the 2008 Summer Olympics
Cyclists at the 2012 Summer Olympics
Cyclists at the 2016 Summer Olympics
Olympic cyclists of Belarus
People from Rechytsa
UCI Track Cycling World Champions (men)
European Games medalists in cycling
European Games gold medalists for Belarus
UCI Road World Champions (elite men)
Belarusian track cyclists
Cyclists at the 2015 European Games
Cyclists at the 2019 European Games
Sportspeople from Gomel Region